Human (also Romanized as Hūmān; also known as Mūhān) is a village in Var Posht Rural District, in the Central District of Tiran and Karvan County, Isfahan Province, Iran. At the 2006 census, its population was 1,346, in 361 families.

References 

Populated places in Tiran and Karvan County